Weihua Zhang is a Canadian electrical engineer, currently a Canada Research Chair at University of Waterloo and a Fellow of the Institute of Electrical and Electronics Engineers, Canadian Academy of Engineering and Engineering Institute of Canada. From 2007 to 2013, she was the Editor-in-Chief of IEEE Transactions on Vehicular Technology.

References

Year of birth missing (living people)
Living people
Academic staff of the University of Waterloo
Canadian electrical engineers
University of New Brunswick alumni